The 14th Daytime Emmy Awards were held on Tuesday, June 30, 1987 to commemorate excellence in daytime programming from the previous year (1986). Telecast from 3-5 p.m. on ABC, the ceremony preempted General Hospital.

Winners in each category are in bold.

Outstanding Daytime Drama Series

All My Children
As the World Turns
Santa Barbara
The Young and the Restless

Outstanding Actor in a Daytime Drama Series

Scott Bryce (Craig Montgomery, As the World Turns)
Larry Bryggman (John Dixon, As the World Turns)
A Martinez (Cruz Castillo, Santa Barbara)
Eric Braeden (Victor Newman, The Young and the Restless)
Terry Lester (Jack Abbott, The Young and the Restless)

Outstanding Actress in a Daytime Drama Series

Susan Lucci (Erica Kane, All My Children)
Elizabeth Hubbard (Lucinda Walsh, As the World Turns)
Frances Reid (Alice Horton, Days of Our Lives)
Kim Zimmer (Reva Shayne, Guiding Light)
Marcy Walker (Eden Capwell, Santa Barbara)

Outstanding Supporting Actor in a Daytime Drama Series

Gregg Marx (Tom Hughes, As the World Turns)
Anthony Call (Herb Callison, One Life to Live)
Al Freeman, Jr. (Ed Hall, One Life to Live)
Justin Deas (Keith Timmons, Santa Barbara)
Richard Eden (Brick Wallace, Santa Barbara)

Outstanding Supporting Actress in a Daytime Drama Series

Kathleen Noone (Ellen Dalton, All My Children)
Lisa Brown (Iva Snyder, As the World Turns)
Kathleen Widdoes (Emma Snyder, As the World Turns)
Peggy McCay (Caroline Brady, Days of Our Lives)
Robin Mattson (Gina Lockridge, Santa Barbara)

Outstanding Young Man in a Daytime Drama Series

Michael E. Knight (Tad Martin, All My Children)
Brian Bloom (Dusty Donovan, As the World Turns)
Jon Hensley (Holden Snyder, As the World Turns)
Billy Warlock (Frankie Brady, Days of Our Lives)
Grant Show (Rick Hyde, Ryan's Hope)

Outstanding Ingenue in a Daytime Drama Series
Martha Byrne (Lily Walsh, As the World Turns)
Krista Tesreau (Mindy Lewis, Guiding Light)
Robin Wright (Kelly Capwell, Santa Barbara)
Jane Krakowski (T.R. Kendall, Search for Tomorrow)
Tracey E. Bregman (Lauren Fenmore, The Young and the Restless)

Outstanding Guest Performer in a Daytime Drama Series

John Wesley Shipp (Martin Ellis, Santa Barbara)
Pamela Blair (Maida Andrews, All My Children)
Terrence Mann (Jester, As the World Turns)
Celeste Holm (Clara Woodhouse and Lydia Woodhouse, Loving)
Eileen Heckart (Ruth Perkins, One Life to Live)

Outstanding Daytime Drama Series Writing
 Days of our Lives
 The Young and the Restless
 One Life to Live

Outstanding Daytime Drama Series Directing
 All My Children
 Days of our Lives
 As the World Turns
 The Young and the Restless

Outstanding Game Show
The $25,000 Pyramid - A Bob-Sande Stewart Production for CBS (Syn. by 20th Century Fox)
Jeopardy! - A Merv Griffin Production (Syn. by KingWorld)
The Price Is Right - A Mark Goodson Production for CBS
Wheel of Fortune - A Merv Griffin Production for NBC (Syn. by KingWorld)

Outstanding Game Show Host
Bob Barker (The Price Is Right)
Dick Clark (The $25,000 Pyramid)
Pat Sajak (Wheel of Fortune)
Alex Trebek (Jeopardy!)

Outstanding Animated Program
Joe Ruby, Ken Spears, Janice Karman, Ross Bagdasarian Jr. and Charles A. Nichols (Alvin and the Chipmunks)
Margaret Loesch, Jim Henson, Lee Gunther, Bob Richardson, Gerry Chiniquy, Bob Kirk, Robert Shellhorn and Jeffrey Scott (Muppet Babies)
Joe Ruby, Ken Spears, Cosmo Anzilotti, Charles A. Nichols John Kimball and Rudy Larriva  (It's Punky Brewster)
Fred Wolf, Art Vitello and Jymn Magon (Disney's Adventures of the Gummi Bears)
Freddy Monnickendam, William Hanna, Joseph Barbera, Bob Hathcock, Ray Patterson, Don Lusk, Jay Sarbry, Carl Urbano and Rudy Zamora (The Smurfs)

References

014
D